Gene Grabowski may refer to:
 Gene Grabowski (soccer)
 Gene Grabowski (communications strategist)